This is a list of World War I-related lists:

 :List of Australian corps in World War I
 :List of Australian divisions in WWI
 :List of British armies in WWI
 :List of British corps in WWI
 :List of British divisions in WWI
 :List of Canadian soldiers executed during World War I
 :List of German weapons of World War I
 :List of Indian divisions in World War I
 :List of Irish people in World War I
 :List of Medal of Honor recipients: World War I
 :List of New Zealand soldiers executed during World War I
 :List of Polish divisions in World War I
 :List of Welsh Victoria Cross recipients of World War I
 :List of World War I books
 :List of World War I flying aces
 :List of World War I video games
 :List of ambulance drivers during World War I
 :List of armoured fighting vehicles of World War I
 :List of books on military executions in World War I
 :List of military engagements of World War I
 :List of national border changes since the twentieth century
 :List of last surviving World War I veterans by country